The South Korea women's national volleyball team (Korean : 대한민국 여자 배구 국가대표팀) represents South Korea in international volleyball competitions and friendly matches. It was one of the leading squads in the world in the 1970s, 1990s and 2010s, having won the bronze medal at the 1976 Summer Olympics in Montreal, Quebec, Canada, and placing fourth at the 1972 Summer Olympics in Munich, Germany,  the 2012 Summer Olympics in London, Great Britain and the 2020 Summer Olympics in Tokyo, Japan.

Results

Olympic Games
 1964 — 6th place
 1968 — 5th place
 1972 — 4th place
 1976 —  Bronze Medal
 1980 — Didn't Qualify due to boycott
 1984 — 5th place
 1988 — 8th place
 1992 — Did not qualify
 1996 — 6th place
 2000 — 8th place
 2004 — 5th place
 2008 — Did not qualify
 2012 — 4th place
 2016 — 5th place
 2020 — 4th place

World Championship
 1967 —  Bronze Medal
 1974 —  Bronze Medal
 1978 — 4th place 
 1982 — 7th place 
 1986 — 8th place 
 1990 — 5th place 
 1994 — 4th place 
 1998 — 9th place 
 2002 — 6th place 
 2006 — 13th place
 2010 — 13th place
 2014 — Did not qualify
 2018 — 17th place
  2022 — 20th place

World Cup
 1973 —  Bronze Medal
 1977 —  Bronze Medal
 1981 — 5th place
 1985 — 7th place
 1989 — 7th place
 1991 — 6th place
 1995 — 5th place
 1999 — 4th place
 2003 — 9th place
 2007 — 8th place
 2011 — 9th place
 2015 — 6th place
 2019 — 6th place

World Grand Prix
 1993 — 5th place
 1994 — 5th place
 1995 — 5th place
 1996 — 7th place
 1997 —  Bronze Medal
 1998 — 6th place
 1999 — 6th place
 2000 — 5th place
 2001 — 7th place
 2003 — 6th place
 2004 — 11th place
 2005 — 9th place
 2006 — 9th place
 2009 — 12th place
 2011 — 9th place
 2012 — 14th place
 2014 — 8th place
 2017 — 14th place

Nations League
 2018 — 12th place
 2019 — 15th place
 2020 — Cancelled due to COVID-19 pandemic
 2021 — 15th place
 2022 — 16th place

World Grand Champions Cup
 1993 — Did not qualify
 1997 — 6th place
 2001 — 6th place
 2005 — 6th place
 2009 — 5th place
 2013 — Did not qualify
 2017 — 6th place

Asian Games
 1962 —  Silver Medal
 1966 —  Silver Medal
 1970 —  Silver Medal
 1974 —  Silver Medal
 1978 —  Bronze Medal
 1982 —  Bronze Medal
 1986 —  Bronze Medal
 1990 —  Silver Medal
 1994 —  Gold Medal
 1998 —  Silver Medal
 2002 —  Silver Medal
 2006 — 5th place
 2010 —  Silver Medal
 2014 —  Gold Medal
 2018 —  Bronze Medal

Asian Volleyball Championship
 1975 —  Silver Medal
 1979 —  Bronze Medal
 1983 —  Bronze Medal
 1987 —  Bronze Medal
 1989 —  Silver Medal
 1991 —  Bronze Medal
 1993 —  Bronze Medal
 1995 —  Silver Medal
 1997 —  Silver Medal
 1999 —  Silver Medal
 2001 —  Silver Medal
 2003 —  Bronze Medal
 2005 — 4th place
 2007 — 4th place
 2009 — 4th place
 2011 —  Bronze Medal
 2013 —  Bronze Medal
 2015 —  Silver Medal
 2017 —  Bronze Medal
 2019 —  Bronze Medal
 2021 — Cancelled due to COVID-19 pandemic

Asian Cup
 2008 —  Silver Medal
 2010 —  Bronze Medal
 2012 — 6th place
 2014 —  Silver Medal
 2016 — 8th place
 2018 — 6th place
 2020 — Cancelled due to COVID-19 pandemic
 2022 — 9th place

Montreux Volley Masters
 1990 —  Bronze Medal
 1991 — 5th place
 1992 —  Bronze Medal
 1993 —  Bronze Medal
 1994 — 6th place
 1995 — 5th place
 1996 — 6th place

Team

Current roster
Head Coach :  Cesar Hernadez Gonzalez (2022~)

The following is the South Korean roster from 2022 FIVB Volleyball Women's World Championships.

Squads

Olympic Games

 1964 Olympic Games — 6th place
 Seo Chun-gang, Moon Kyung-Sook, Yu Chun-ja, Kim Gil-ja, O Sun-ok, Jeong Jeong-eun, Choi Don-hui, Hong Nam-seon, O Cheong-ja, Yun Jeong-suk, Gwag Yong-ja, Lee Geun-su. Head coach:
 1968 Olympic Games — 5th place
 An Gyeong-ja, Hwang Gyu-ok, Kim Young-ja, Kim Oe-sun, Kim Yeong-Ja, Lee Hyang-sim, Moon Kyung-Sook, Park Geum-suk, Seo Hui-suk, Yang Jin-su, Kwack Yong-Ja. Head coach:
 1972 Olympic Games — 4th place
 Kim Chung–Han, Yu Kyung-hwa, Yoon Young-nae, Yu Jung-hye, Jo Hea-jung, Lee In-sook, Kim Kun–Bong, Lee Jung-Ja, Lee Soon-bok, Kim Yeong-Ja, Kim Eun–Hie. Head coach:
 1976 Olympic Games —  Bronze Medal
Lee Soon-Bok, Yu Jung-Hye, Byon Myung-Ja, Lee Soon-ok, Baik Myung-Sun, Chang Hee-Sook, Ma Kum-Ja, Yoon Young-nae, Yu Kyung-Hwa, Park Mi-Kum, Jo Hea-Jung, and Jung Soon-ok. Head coach: Kim Han-Soo.
 1984 Olympic Games — 5th place
 Lee Eun-Kyung, Lee Un-Yim, Jin Chun-Mae, Lee Young-Sun, Kim Jeong-Sun, Jea Sook-Ja, Han Kyung-Ae, Lee Myung-Hee, Kim Ok-Soon, Park Mi-Hee, Lim Hye-Sook, and Yoon Chung-Hye.
 1988 Olympic Games — 8th place
Park Mi-Hee, Kim Kyung-Hee, Kim Kui-Soon, Lim Hye-Sook, Yoo Young-Mi, Nam Soon-Ok, Yoon Chung-Hye, Park Bok-Rye, Kim Yoon-Hye, Sun Mi-Sook, Moon Sun-Hee, and Ji Kyung-Hee. Head coach: Hwang Sung-On.
 1996 Olympic Games — 6th place
 Chang So-Yun, Chang Yoon-Hee, Choi Kwang-Hee, Chung Sun-Hye, Eoh Yeon-Soon, Hong Ji-Yeon, Kang Hye-Mi, Kim Nam-Soon, Lee In-Sook, Lee Soo-Jung, Park Soo-Jeong, and Yoo Yin-Kyung. Head coach: Kim Cheol-Yong.
 2000 Olympic Games — 8th place
Chang So-Yun, Choi Kwang-Hee, Chung Sun-Hye, Eoh Yeon-Soon, Kang Hye-Mi, Kim Guy-Hyun, Koo Ki-Lan, Ku Min-Jung, Lee Meong-Hee, Lee Yun-Hui, Park Mee-Kyung, and Park Soo-Jeong. Head coach: Kim Cheol-Yong.
 2004 Olympic Games — 5th place
 Lee Jung-Ok, Kang Hye-Mi, Ku Min-Jung, Kim Sa-Nee, Choi Kwang-Hee, Nam Jie-Youn, Chang So-Yun, Kim Mi-Jin, Pak Sun-Mi, Jung Dae-Young, Han Song-Yi, and Kim Se-Young. Head coach: Kim Cheol-Yong.
 2012 Olympic Games — 4th place
 Ha Joon-eem, Kim Sa-nee (C), Kim Hae-ran, Lim Hyo-sook, Kim Yeon-koung, Han Yoo-mi, Han Song-yi, Jung Dae-young, Hwang Youn-joo, Yang Hyo-jin, Kim Hee-jin, Lee Sook-ja. Head coach: Kim Hyung-sil.
 2016 Olympic Games — 5th place
 Lee Hyo-hee, Kim Hee-jin, Kim Hae-ran, Hwang Youn-joo, Lee Jae-yeong, Nam Jie-youn, Kim Yeon-koung  (C), Kim Su-ji, Park Jeong-ah, Yang Hyo-jin, Bae Yoo-na, Yeum Hye-seon. Head coach: Lee Jung-chul.
 2020 Olympic Games — 4th place
 Lee So-young, Yeum Hye-seon, Kim Hee-jin, Ahn Hye-jin, Park Eun-jin, Oh Ji-young, Kim Yeon-koung  (C), Kim Su-ji, Park Jeong-ah, Yang Hyo-jin, Jeong Ji-yun, Pyo Seung-ju. Head coach: Stefano Lavarini.

World Championships 
 1998 FIVB World Championship — 9th place 
Kang Hye-mi, Ku Min-jung, Kang Mee-sun, Kim Chang-hun, Park Mee-kyung, Chung Sun-hye, Jung Eun-sun, Park Soo-jeong, Hong Ji-yeon, Kim Young-sook, Chang So-yun, Lee Meong-hee. Head coach: Kim Hyung-Sil.
 2002 FIVB World Championship — 6th place 
Chang So-yun, Choi Kwang-hee, Chung Sun-hye, Han Yoo-mi, Jung Dae-young, Kang Hye-mi, Kim Mi-jin, Kim Sa-nee, Koo Ki-lan, Ku Min-jung, Lee Meong-hee, Park Mee-kyung. Head coach: Ryu Hoa-suk.
 2006 FIVB World Championship — 13th place 
Kim Sa-nee, Nam Jie-youn, Han Yoo-mi, Kim Ji-hyun, Kim Yeon-koung, Han Soo-ji, Han Song-yi, Jung Dae-young, Hwang Youn-joo, Kim Se-young, Kim Hae-ran, Bae Yoo-na. Head coach: Kim Myeong-soo.
 2010 FIVB World Championship — 13th place 
Oh Ji-young, Kim Sa-nee, Nam Jie-youn, Yim Myung-ok, Kim Yeon-koung, Han Yoo-mi, Han Song-yi, Jung Dae-young, Hwang Youn-joo, Kim Se-young,  Lee So-ra, Yang Hyo-jin. Head coach: Park Sam-ryong.

World Cup
 1999 FIVB World Cup — 4th place
Chang So-Yun, Chang Yoon-Hee, Choi Kwang-Hee, Chung Sun-Hye, Eoh Yeon-Soon, Hong Ji-Yeon, Kang Hye-Mi, Kim Sa-Nee, Ku Min-Jung, Lee Yun-Hui, Park Mee-Kyung, and Park Soo-Jeong. Head coach: Kim Cheol-Yong.
 2003 FIVB World Cup — 9th place
Chang So-Yun, Choi Kwang-Hee, Jung Dae-Young, Kang Hye-Mi, Kim Hyang-Suk, Kim Sa-Nee, Koo Ki-Lan, Lee Meong-Hee, Lim Yu-Jin, Nam Jie-Youn, Park Mee-Kyung, and Yang Sook-Kyung. Head coach: Kim Cheol-Yong.
 2007 FIVB World Cup — 8th place
Bae Yoo-na, Ji Jung-Hee, Kim Sa-Nee, Kim Hae-Ran, La Hae-Won, Kim Yeon-Koung, Han Yoo-Mi, Han Song-Yi, Jung Dae-Young, Kim Se-Young, Kwak Mi-Ran, and Yeum Hye-Seon. Head coach: Lee Jung-Chul.
 2011 FIVB World Cup — 9th place
Kim Min-Ji, Jung Ji-Youn, Hwang Youn-Joo, Choi Youn-Ok, Yoon Hye-Suk, Nam Jie-Youn, Kim Yeon-Koung, Lee Bo-Lam, Kim Se-Young, Kim Hye-Jin, Kim Hee-Jin, and Park Jeong-Ah. Head coach: Kim Hyung-Sil.
 2015 FIVB World Cup — 6th place
Lee So-Young, Kim Hee-Jin, Na Hyun-Jung, Hwang Youn-Joo, Lee Jae-Yeong, Kim Yeon-Koung, Kim Su-Ji, Park Jeong-Ah, Yang Hyo-Jin, Chae Seon-Ah, Lee Da-Yeong, Cho Song-Hwa, and Yim Myung-Ok. Head coach: Lee Jung-Chul.
 2019 FIVB World Cup — 6th place
Lee So-Young, Yeum Hye-Seon, Kim Hee-Jin, Kim Hae-Ran, Ha Hye-Jin, Park Eun-jin, Oh Ji-Young, Kim Yeon-Koung, Kim Su-Ji, Park Jeong-Ah, Yang Hyo-Jin, Kang So-Hwi, Lee Jae-Yeong, and Lee Da-Yeong. Head coach: Stefano Lavarini.

Asian Women's Volleyball Championship
 2003 Asian Women's Volleyball Championship —  Bronze Medal
 Choi Kwang-hee, Hong Mi-sun, Kim Hyang-suk, Lee Sook-ja, Lee Meong-hee, Jung Dae-young, Lee Yun-hui, Nam Jie-youn, Kim Sa-nee, Kim Mi-jin, Lim Yu-jin. Head coach: Kim Cheol-yong.
 2011 Asian Women's Volleyball Championship —  Bronze Medal
 Kim Yeon-koung, Han Song-yi, Kim Hee-jin, Hwang Youn-joo, Kim Hye-jin, Park Jeong-ah, Jung Dae-young, Yoon Hye-suk, Lee Hyo-hee, Nam Jie-youn, Kim Se-young, Lee Jae-eun. Head coach: Kim Hyung-sil.
 2013 Asian Women's Volleyball Championship —  Bronze Medal
 Lee Da-yeong, Kim Su-ji, Pyo Seung-ju, Han Song-yi, Kim Hee-jin, Park Jeong-ah, Kim Yeon-koung, Oh Ji-young, Kim Hae-ran, Lee Jae-eun, Lee Jae-yeong, Bae Yoo-na. Head coach: Cha Hae-won.
 2015 Asian Women's Volleyball Championship —  Silver Medal
 Lee Hyo-hee, Kim Su-ji, Kim Yu-ri, Moon Jung-won, Kim Hee-jin, Park Jeong-ah, Kim Yeon-koung, Na Hyun-jung, Nam Jie-youn, Han Su-ji, Lee Jae-yeong, Yang Hyo-jin. Head coach: Lee Jung-chul.
 2017 Asian Women's Volleyball Championship —  Bronze Medal
 Lee Jae-eun, Kim Yeon-gyeon, Yeum Hye-seon, Kim Hee-jin, Na Hyun-jung, Han Soo-ji, Kim Yeon-koung (C), Kim Su-ji, Park Jeong-ah, Yang Hyo-jin, Kim Yu-ri, Kim Mi-youn, Hwang Min-kyoung. Head coach: Hong Sung-jin.
 2019 Asian Women's Volleyball Championship —  Bronze Medal
 Lee So-young, Lee Ju-ah, Yeum Hye-seon, Kim Hee-jin, Kim Hae-ran, Lee Na-yeon, Ha Hye-jin, Park Eun-jin, Oh Ji-young, Kim Yeon-koung, Kim Su-ji, Yang Hyo-jin, Lee Jae-yeong, Pyo Seung-ju. Head coach: Stefano Lavarini.

Nations League
 2018 Nations League 
Kim Yeon-koung (C), Lee Hyo-hee, Na Hyun-soo, Kim Ju-hyang, Kim Hae-ran (L), Kim Hee-jin, Lee Na-yeon, Yim Myung-ok (L), Jeong Sun-ah, Kim Su-ji, Kim Chae-yeon, Park Jeong-ah, Yang Hyo-jin, Kang Soh-wi, Lee Jae-yeong, Yoo Seo-yeun, Lee Da-yeong, Na Hyun-jung (L), Lee Won-jeong, Park Eu-jin Head coach: Cha Hae-won
 2022 FIVB Volleyball Women's Nations League 
Park Jeong-ah (C), Yeum Hye-seon, Han Da-hye (L), Noh Ran (L), Lee Seon-woo, Kang So-hwi, Jung Ho-young, Lee Ju-ah, Go Ye-rim, Park Hye-min, Lee Da-hyeon, Hwang Min-kyoung, Lee Han-bi, Park Hye-jin, Choi Jeong-min, Kim Hee-jin Head coach: Cesar Hernandez

See also
 V-League
South Korea men's national volleyball team

References

2008 Olympic Qualifier

External links
KVA Official Website
FIVB profile

Volleyball
Korea, South
Women's volleyball in South Korea